An office is a space where an organization's employees perform administrative work to support and realize objects and goals of the organization. The word "office" may also denote a position within an organization with specific duties attached to it (see officer, office-holder, official); the latter is in fact an earlier usage, office as place originally referring to the location of one's duty. When used as an adjective, the term "office" may refer to business-related tasks. In law, a company or organization has offices in any place where it has an official presence, even if that presence consists of (for example) a storage silo rather than an establishment with desk-and-chair. An office is also an architectural and design phenomenon: ranging from a small office such as a bench in the corner of a small business of extremely small size (see small office/home office), through entire floors of buildings, up to and including massive buildings dedicated entirely to one company. In modern terms an office is usually the location where white-collar workers carry out their functions. 

Offices in classical antiquity were often part of a palace complex or a large temple. The High Middle Ages (1000–1300) saw the rise of the medieval chancery, which was where most government letters were written and where laws were copied in the administration of a kingdom. With the growth of large, complex organizations in the 18th century, the first purpose-built office spaces were constructed. As the Industrial Revolution intensified in the 18th and 19th centuries, the industries of banking, rail, insurance, retail, petroleum, and telegraphy grew dramatically, requiring many clerks, and as a result more office space was assigned to house their activities. The time-and-motion study, pioneered in manufacturing by F. W. Taylor (1856-1915) led to the "Modern Efficiency Desk" of 1915 with a flat top and drawers below, designed to allow managers an easy view of the workers. However, by the middle of the 20th century, it became apparent that an efficient office required discretion in the control of privacy, and gradually the cubicle system evolved.

The main purpose of an office environment is to support its occupants in performing their jobs. Work spaces in an office are typically used for conventional office activities such as reading, writing, and computer work. There are nine generic types of work space, each supporting different activities. In addition to individual cubicles, one can find meeting rooms, lounges, and spaces for support activities, such as photocopying and filing. Some offices also have a kitchen area where workers can make their lunches. There are many different ways of arranging the space in an office and whilst these vary according to function, managerial fashions and the culture of specific companies can be even more important.
While offices can be built in almost any location and in almost any building, some modern requirements for offices make this more difficult, such as requirements for light, networking, and security. The major purpose of an office building is to provide a workplace and working environment - primarily for administrative and managerial workers. These workers usually occupy set areas within the office building, and usually are provided with desks, PCs and other equipment they may need within these areas. The chief operating officer (COO) is responsible for handling administration and maintenance of an office building.

History

The structure and shape of the office are impacted by both management thought as well as construction materials and may or may not have walls or barriers. The word stems from the Latin officium, and its equivalents in various, mainly romance, languages. An officium was not necessarily a place, but rather an often mobile 'bureau' in the sense of a human staff or even the abstract notion of a formal position, such as a magistrature. The relatively elaborate Roman bureaucracy would not be equaled for centuries in the West after the fall of Rome, even partially reverting to illiteracy, while the East preserved a more sophisticated administrative culture, both under Byzantium and under Islam.

Offices in classical antiquity were often part of a palace complex or a large temple. There was usually a room where scrolls were kept and scribes did their work. Ancient texts mentioning the work of scribes allude to the existence of such "offices". These rooms are sometimes called "libraries" by some archaeologists and the general press because one often associates scrolls with literature. In fact, they were true offices since the scrolls were meant for record-keeping and other management functions such as treaties and edicts, and not for writing or keeping poetry or other works of fiction.

Middle Ages

The High Middle Ages (1000–1300) saw the rise of the medieval chancery, which was usually the place where most government letters were written and where laws were copied in the administration of a kingdom. The rooms of the chancery often had walls full of pigeonholes, constructed to hold rolled up pieces of parchment for safekeeping or ready reference, a precursor to the bookshelf. The introduction of printing during the Renaissance did not change these early government offices much.

Medieval illustrations, such as paintings or tapestries, often show people in their private offices handling record-keeping books or writing on scrolls of parchment. All kinds of writings seemed to be mixed in these early forms of offices. Before the invention of the printing press and its distribution there was often a very thin line between a private office and a private library since books were read or written in the same space at the same desk or table, and general accounting and personal or private letters were also done there.

It was during the 13th century that the English form of the word first appeared when referring to a position involving duties (ex. the office of the ...). Geoffrey Chaucer appears to have first used the word in 1395 to mean a place where business is transacted in The Canterbury Tales.

As mercantilism became the dominant economic theory of the Renaissance, merchants tended to conduct their business in the same buildings, which might include retail sales, warehousing and clerical work. During the 15th century, population density in many cities reached the point where stand-alone buildings were used by merchants to conduct their business, and there was a developing a distinction between church, government/military, and commerce uses for buildings.

Emergence of the modern office
With the growth of large, complex organizations such as the Royal Navy and the East India Company in the 18th century, the first purpose-built office spaces were constructed. The Old Admiralty (Ripley Building) was built in 1726 as a three-storey U-shaped brick building and was the first purpose-built office building in Great Britain. As well as offices, the building housed a board room and apartments for the Lords of the Admiralty. In the 1770s, many scattered offices for the Royal Navy were gathered into Somerset House, the first block purpose-built for office work.

The East India House was built in 1729 on Leadenhall Street as the headquarters from which the East India Company administered its Indian colonial possessions. The Company developed a very complex bureaucracy for the task, which required thousands of office employees to process the necessary paperwork. The Company recognized the benefits of centralized administration, and required that all workers sign in and out at the central office, daily.

As the Industrial Revolution intensified in the 18th and 19th centuries, the industries of banking, rail, insurance, retail, petroleum, and telegraphy dramatically grew in size and complexity. To transact business, an increasingly large number of clerks were needed to handle order-processing, accounting, and document filing, with increasingly specialized office space required to house these activities. Most of the desks of the era were top-heavy with paper storage bins extending above the desk-work area, giving the appearance of a cubicle and offering the workers some degree of privacy.

The relatively high price of land in the central core of cities lead to the first multi-story buildings, which were limited to about 10 stories until the use of iron and steel allowed for higher structures. The first purpose-built office block was the Brunswick Building, built in Liverpool in 1841. The invention of the safety elevator in 1852 by Elisha Otis saw the rapid escalation upward of buildings. By the end of the 19th century, larger office buildings frequently contained large glass atriums to allow light into the complex and improve air circulation.

20th century

By 1906, Sears, Roebuck and Co had opened their mail order and headquarters operation in a  building in Chicago, at the time the largest building in the world. The time and motion study, pioneered in manufacturing by F. W. Taylor and later applied to the office environment by Frank and Lillian Gilbreth, led to the idea that managers needed to play an active role in directing the work of subordinates in order to increase the efficiency of the workplace. F.W. Taylor advocated the use of large, open floor plans, and desks that faced supervisors. As a result, in 1915, the Equitable Life Insurance Company in New York City introduced the “Modern Efficiency Desk” with a flat top and drawers below, designed to allow managers an easy view of the workers. This led to a demand for a large square footages per floor in buildings, and a return to the open spaces that were seen in pre–industrial revolution buildings.

However, by the midpoint of the 20th century, it became apparent that an efficient office required discretion in the control of privacy, which is needed to combat tedium linked to poor productivity, and to encourage creativity. In 1964, the Herman Miller (office equipment) company engaged Robert Propst, a prolific industrial designer, who came up with the concept of the Action Office which later evolved into the cubicle office furniture system.

Japan 20th century office 

Japanese businesses have set themselves apart from their American counterparts by implementing different techniques in the way they handle business. The Japanese office layout improves work productivity, harmony in the office, and holds every employee accountable for the work they produce. The type of office layout used in Japan is called an open plan, and relies on ergonomics to help make employees as productive as possible. The Japanese open office layout allows them to use an organizational structure known as the horizontal structure. In the typical Japanese office there are no walls dividing desks, no cubicles, and no individual offices. Also they are able to implement policies using the ringi-sho consensus.

In order to get group members to work effectively in the open office floor plan the use of island-style desks are used. The most dominant feature of the Japanese island-style office layout is that each group forms an island. Kageyu Noro, Goroh Fujimaki & Shinsuke Kishi, researchers of ergonomics in the workplace, stated,” Japanese offices have traditionally adhered to island layouts because these reflect the Japanese style of teamwork and top-down style of management.” The group leader will then sit at the prominent position and ensure productivity.

The group leader will assign a task to the group, and each member of the group then receives their individual task to complete. Island-style seating also gives the group the benefit of being able to speak to one another at any time, and ask for help if needed. Being in such close proximity to one another in the office gives another advantage to the supervisor in that he can call an uchi-awase. Uchi-awase is an informal meeting in order to get an important message across, and also allows all members of the team to be creative in the office. “The open office layout allows for this because there are hardly any independent rooms or enclosures. If the supervisor stands at his desk he can glance at his associates and easily call them over.”, according to Durlabhji, Subhash, Norton E. Marks, and Scott Roach, authors of Japanese Business: Cultural Perspective. Once all individual tasks are complete the group then combines each person's work and the project is the put together as a whole and returned to the supervisor. The work is viewed as a team effort and that each member of the group receives equal credit for being part of a team completing the goal assigned. The group itself holds each member accountable for ensuring that the work is getting done, and that no one individual is doing more work than another. Another motivating factor is that the group's boss is also seated at the same desk, and the effect that this has on the individuals is that they must work hard just like the boss. The role of having an open layout with island-type seating allows the office to be structured so the employees are put together as teams.

The type of organizational structure found within the Japanese office is known as a horizontal structure. According to Andrew, Ghillyer, author of Management Now, "Horizontal structure is an organization structure consisting of two groups: the first composed of senior management responsible for strategic decisions and policies and the second composed of empowered employees working together in different process teams; also known as a team structure.” The benefit of using this type of structure is that hierarchy is flattened to reduce supervision, teams are able to self-manage, team performance, not just the individual is rewarded, and training is highly emphasized amongst all employees. With the heightened sense of empowerment and responsibility workers are motivated to complete objectives in a timely manner. Having the office structured horizontally allows for easy communication of introducing new policies and ideas amongst the groups.

“Ringisho” is the concept of submitting proposals and making decisions off those ideas. By unifying everyone together in the Japanese office it helps to make better-informed decisions on policies of the company that all managers and employees have input on. The idea behind this is to get a hold of various thinking individuals to see if there is a good way in writing their policies that come to benefit the company better. Richard Lewis, author of When Cultures Collide, states “Suggestions, ideas and inventions make their way up the company hierarchy by a process of collecting signatures among workers and middle managers. Many people are involved. Top executives take the final step in ratifying items that have won sufficient approval.” With this system in place changes to policies are only passed if there is an overall consensus to pass it. Allowing each group to have a say on which policies should be implemented improves overall job satisfaction and harmony throughout the office.

The way Japanese offices are structured allow them to be more efficient when conducting business. The efficiency at which they operate has been noticed by such companies as General Motors, Ford, Motorola, and Chrysler Company. They continue to look for other ways to be more efficient and productive with the office layout and employee productivity.

Office spaces

The main purpose of an office environment is to support its occupants in performing their job—preferably at minimum cost and to maximum satisfaction. With different people performing different tasks and activities, however, it is not always easy to select the right office spaces. To aid decision-making in workplace and office design, one can distinguish three different types of office spaces: workspaces, meeting spaces and support spaces. For new, or developing businesses, remote satellite offices and project rooms, serviced offices can provide a simple solution and provide all of the former types of space.

Workspaces
Workspaces in an office are typically used for conventional office activities such as reading, writing and computer work. There are nine generic types of workspaces, each supporting different activities.

Open office: An open workspace for more than ten people, suitable for activities which demand frequent communication or routine activities which need relatively little concentration

Team space: A semi-enclosed workspace for two to eight people; suitable for teamwork which demands frequent internal communication and a medium level of concentration

Cubicle: A semi-enclosed workspace for one person, suitable for activities which demand medium concentration and medium interaction

Private office: An enclosed workspace for one person, suitable for activities which are confidential, demand a lot of concentration or include many small meetings

Shared office: An enclosed workspace for two or three people, suitable for semi-concentrated work and collaborative work in small groups

Team room: An enclosed workspace for four to ten people; suitable for teamwork which may be confidential and demands frequent internal communication

Study booth: An enclosed workspace for one person; suitable for short-term activities which demand concentration or confidentiality

Work lounge: A lounge-like workspace for two to six people; suitable for short-term activities which demand collaboration and/or allow impromptu interaction

Touch down: An open workspace for one person; suitable for short-term activities which require little concentration and low interaction

Meeting spaces
Meeting spaces in an office typically use interactive processes, be it quick conversations or intensive brainstorms. There are six generic types of meeting space, each supporting different activities.

Small meeting room: An enclosed meeting space for two to four persons, suitable for both formal and informal interaction

Large meeting room: An enclosed meeting space for five to twelve people, suitable for formal interaction

Small meeting space: An open or semi-open meeting space for two to four persons; suitable for short, informal interaction

Large meeting space: An open or semi-open meeting space for five to twelve people; suitable for short, informal interaction

Brainstorm room: An enclosed meeting space for five to twelve people; suitable for brainstorming sessions and workshops

Meeting point: An open meeting point for two to four persons; suitable for ad hoc, informal meetings

Support spaces
Support spaces in an office are typically used for secondary activities such as filing documents or taking a break. There are twelve generic types of support space, each supporting different activities.

Filing space: An open or enclosed support space for the storage of frequently used files and documents

Storage space: An open or enclosed support space for the storage of commonly used office supplies

Print and copy area: An open or enclosed support space with facilities for printing, scanning and copying

Mail area: An open or semi-open support space where employees can pick up or deliver their mail

Pantry area: An open or enclosed support space where employees can get refreshments and supplies for visitor hospitality are kept.

Break area: A semi-open or enclosed support space where employees can take a break from their work

Locker area: An open or semi-open support space where employees can store their personal belongings

Smoking room: An enclosed support space where employees can smoke a cigarette

Library: A semi-open or enclosed support space for reading of books, journals and magazines

Games room: An enclosed support space where employees can play games (e.g. computer games, pool, darts)

Lactation room: as of the 2010 Patient Protection and Affordable Care Act, a requirement for companies in the United States.

Waiting area: An open or semi-open support space where visitors can be received and can wait for their appointment

Circulation space: Support space which is required for circulation on office floors, linking all major functions

Office structure

There are many different ways of arranging the space in an office and whilst these vary according to function, managerial fashions, and the culture of specific companies can be even more important. Choices include, how many people will work within the same room. At one extreme, each individual worker will have their own room; at the other extreme a large open plan office can be made up of one main room with tens or hundreds of people working in the same space. Open-plan offices put multiple workers together in the same space, and some studies have shown that they can improve short-term productivity, i.e. within a single software project. At the same time, the loss of privacy and security can increase the incidence of theft and loss of company secrets. A type of compromise between open plan and individual rooms is provided by the cubicle desk, possibly made most famous by the Dilbert cartoon series, which solves visual privacy to some extent, but often fails on acoustic separation and security. Most cubicles also require the occupant to sit with their back towards anyone who might be approaching; workers in walled offices almost always try to position their normal work seats and desks so that they can see someone entering, and in some instances, install tiny mirrors on things such as computer monitors.

Office buildings

While offices can be built in almost any location and in almost any building, some modern requirements for offices make this more difficult. These requirements can be both legal (e.g., light levels must be sufficient) or technical (e.g., requirements for computer networking). Alongside, other requirements such as security and flexibility of layout, has led to the creation of special buildings which are dedicated only or primarily for use as offices. An office building, also known as an office block or business center is a form of commercial building which contains spaces mainly designed to be used for offices.

The primary purpose of an office building is to provide a workplace and working environment primarily for administrative and managerial workers. These workers usually occupy set areas within the office building, and usually are provided with desks, PCs and other equipment they may need within these areas.

An office building will be divided into sections for different companies or may be dedicated to one company. In either case, each company will typically have a reception area, one or several meeting rooms, singular or open-plan offices, as well as toilets.

Many office buildings also have kitchen facilities and a staff room, where workers can have lunch or take a short break. Many office spaces are now also serviced office spaces, which means that those occupying a space or building can share facilities.

Office and retail rental rates

Rental rates for office and retail space are typically quoted in terms of money per floor-area–time, usually money per floor-area per year or month. For example, the rate for a particular property may be $29 per square-foot per year ($29/s.f/yr) - $290 per square-meter–year ($290/m2/a), and rates in the area could range $20–$50/s.f./yr ($200–$500/m2·a).

In many countries, rent is typically paid monthly even if usually discussed in terms of years.

Examples:
 A particular 2,000 s.f. space is priced at $15/s.f./yr = (2,000 s.f.) × ($15/s.f./a) / (12 mo/yr) = $2500/month
 A 200 m2 space priced at $150/m2·a = (200 m2) × ($150/m2·a) / (12 mo/a) = $2500/month

In a gross lease, the rate quoted is an all-inclusive rate. One pays a set amount of rent per time and the landlord is responsible for all other expenses such as costs of utilities, taxes, insurance, maintenance, and repairs.

The triple net lease is one in which the tenant is liable for a share of various expenses such as property taxes, insurance, maintenance, utilities, climate control, repairs, janitorial services and landscaping.

Office rents in the United States are still recovering from the high vacancy rates that occurred in the wake of the 2008 depression.

Grading

The Building Owners and Managers Association (BOMA) classifies office space into three categories: Class A, Class B, and Class C. According to BOMA, Class A office buildings have the "most prestigious buildings competing for premier office users with rents above average for the area". BOMA states that Class A facilities have "high-quality standard finishes, state of the art systems, exceptional accessibility and a definite market presence". BOMA describes Class B office buildings as those that compete "for a wide range of users with rents in the average range for the area". BOMA states that Class B buildings have "adequate systems" and finishes that "are fair to good for the area", but that the buildings do not compete with Class A buildings for the same prices. According to BOMA Class C buildings are aimed towards "tenants requiring functional space at rents below the average for the area". The lack of specifics allows considerable room for "fudging" the boundaries of the categories. Oftentimes, the above categories are further modified by adding the plus or minus sign to create subclasses, such as Class A+ or Class B-.

See also 

 Physical
Business park
Corner office
Executive suite
Factory
Office space planning
Office supplies
Over-illumination
Steel buildings
Warehouse

 Soft issues
Business attire
Office management
Office politics
Sick building syndrome

References

Further reading

External links

 Early Office Museum

 
 
Rooms